Computed tomography enterography (CT enterography, CTE) is a medical imaging technique which uses computed tomography scanner and contrast media to examine the small bowel. It was first introduced by  Raptopoulos et al. in 1997. CT Enterography can be used to assess a variety of problems involving the small bowel, however it is mainly used to diagnosis and assess severity of Crohn's disease.

CT enterography should not be confused with CT enteroclysis. In CT enterography contrast media is given orally, and in CT enteroclysis contrast media is administered through a fluoroscopy-guided positioned nasojejunal tube.

Advantages
CTE provides enough distention of the bowel not present during normal CT imaging to increase the ability to examine in lumen and internal lining of the small intestines. When the small bowel is not properly distended it can be difficult to see if there is a problem in that area.  CTE also provides better visualization of extraenteric findings, as well as acute inflammation, of Crohn's disease. These extraenteric findings include, but no limited to, fistulas and abscesses. Additionally, compared with CT enteroclysis, the patient does not need to be sedated for CTE nor requires the invasive step of placing the nasojejunal tube.

Disadvantages 
While CTE's main use is in the diagnosis and follow up in Crohn's disease, many of the findings on Crohn's disease found on CTE can be caused by a wide variety of other conditions. Spasm and collapse of the small intestine, which can happen in Crohn's disease, can obscure imaging of that portion of the bowel even with CTE.

Indications

 Suspected small bowel bleeding in a hemodynamically stable patient
 Crohn's disease
 Initially evaluation and follow up
 Unexplained diarrhea
 Small Bowel masses
 Malignant
 Adenocarcinoma
 Carcinoid
 Lymphoma
 Gastrointestinal stromal tumor
 Non-malignant
 Hyperplastic polyps
 Hamartomatous polyps sencondary to Peutz–Jeghers syndrome
 Adenomas
 Lipomas
 Hemangiomas
 Ectopic gastric or pancreatic tissue
 Meckel's diverticulum

Protocol 
At least four hours of no intake of solid foods, patient may have clear liquids. Metoclopramide (Reglan) will be administered to assist with emptying the stomach and increase movement through the small intestines. Large amounts of an oral contrast agent are given to the patient. Neutral contrast agents are preferred over positive contrast agents such as barium. The neutral agents are vitally important for the effective visualization of the lining of the small intestine. Use of positive contrast agents could make it difficult to see any inflammation in the lining. Neutral agents include water, EG electrolyte solution, sugar alcohols, and methylcellulose. Patient are usually able to drink the large of amounts of these agents required for the study with major difficulty. This step is given at increments of 0, 20, 40, and 55 minutes after Reglan dose. Glucagon is given to patient five minutes before they enter the CT scanner to counter act the previous medication and attempt to slow down bowel activity.  Intravenous contrast is also given when the patient is on the scanner. The patient will then enter the scanner for the image to be captured.

Use in Crohn's Disease 
CTE is preferred for the examination of Crohn's disease due to its increased spatial resolution and better ability to examine the wall of the small intestine than traditional CT studies of the abdomen and pelvis. Findings on CTE that indicate acitive inflammation in the small bowel, possibly caused by Crohn's disease, include:

 Mural hyperenhancement
 Mural stratification
 Thickening of bowel wall
 Mesenteric fat stranding
 Enlarged vasa recta

CTE is also used in examining if bowel inflammation improves after therapy and if the disease is progressing in a concerning way.

Contraindications and special considerations 

 Pregnancy
 Bowel obstruction
 Magnetic Resonance Enterography if that patient has a history of many CT scans previously
 CT of abdomen and pelvis if unable to tolerate oral contrast

See also
MR enterography
Upper gastrointestinal series

References

Radiology
X-ray computed tomography